Adrian Teh Kean Kok (born 1984) is a Malaysian film producer and director.

Career
Adrian Teh is one of the renowned director and producer in Malaysia. He founded and presided over the Chinese Film Association of Malaysia in 2012, and organized Malaysia’s first ever Chinese movies awards ceremony – the Golden Wau Awards – in 2013. Teh is highly recognized as one of the Top-10 Outstanding Youths of Malaysia in 2016, (JCI TOYM)  and was named in the 2016 list of 100 Most Influential Young Entrepreneurs (MIYE 2016).

Teh has directed numerous Malaysian Chinese movies, including “Lelio Popo” , “The Wedding Diary”, “The Wedding Diary 2”, “King of Mahjong” & etc. In 2018, Teh directed Malaysia’s first military action-packed movie that is based on  true events - “PASKAL The Movie”. PASKAL recorded RM30million in box office sales. Since then, Teh started to explore further in Malay film industry. In 2019, he directed an action-packed movie – “WIRA”. In order to make it a world class action film, he’s managed to hire renowned Indonesian action star Yayan Ruhian, who had involved in few Hollywood movies to choreograph the action sequences in the film.

In 2020, he attends to many new challenges. He directed his first Malay rom-com - “Pasal Kau” (All Because Of You) – the first Netflix Malaysian original film which is available in over 190 countries. Besides, he directed his first suspense-thriller series – “Model Family”, the first original production by Celestial Tiger Entertainment / Thrill.

This year, despite the pandemic's impact on the industry, he continues to seek and achieve new goals. “Ada Hantu”, a horror film produced by Teh will be streaming exclusively via Disney+ Hotstar Malaysia on Aug 13.

Filmography

References

External links
 'Paskal' director Adrian Teh goes from action to rom-com with 'Pasal Kau'
 "Wira" will kick off Adrian Teh's local heroes cinematic universe
 New film 'Wira' kicks into high gear with its action sequences
 Bakara papar peristiwa sebenar di Mogadishu
 

Malaysian film directors
1984 births
Living people
People from Penang
Malaysian people of Chinese descent